Annectocymidae is a family of bryozoans belonging to the order Cyclostomatida.

Genera:
 Annectocyma Hayward & Ryland, 1985
 Entalophoroecia Harmelin, 1976

References

Bryozoan families